Flann Mac Flainn was fifth Archbishop of Tuam, 1250–1256.

Life
He was chancellor of Tuam, and sub-deacon to the pope when he was elected archbishop about May 1250; the royal assent was given on 27 May, and seisin was granted on 25 July, but MacFlynn appears to have had to go to Rome, and he was not consecrated till 25 December 1250. 
In the following year, like his predecessors, he endeavoured to obtain possession of the see of Ennachdune or Annaghdown in Galway, his opponent, Concord, was at first supported by the king, but MacFlynn eventually obtained confirmation. 
He held a synod at Tuam in 1251. 
His episcopate was marked by some quarrels with Thomas, the bishop-elect of Achonry in 1251, and Thomas, bishop of Cionmacnoise in 1255.

The History of the Popes describes him as:

See also
 Glynn (disambiguation)

References

Attribution

External links
 http://www.ucc.ie/celt/published/T100005C/
 https://archive.org/stream/fastiecclesiaehi04cottuoft#page/n17/mode/2up

Archbishops of Tuam
Medieval Gaels from Ireland
People from County Galway
13th-century Roman Catholic archbishops in Ireland
1256 deaths
Year of birth unknown